Allan McClory (11 November 1899 – 9 July 1983) was a Scottish footballer who played as a goalkeeper for Harthill Bluebell, Shotts United, Motherwell, Albion Rovers, Montrose and Brideville. The vast majority of his career was spent with Motherwell; he was part of the team which won the club's only Scottish Football League title in 1931–32 (the pinnacle of eight consecutive seasons in which they finished in the top three), and played in two Scottish Cup finals – 1931 and 1933, both lost to Celtic.

McClory represented Scotland three times and the Scottish Football League XI twice.

References

Sources

1899 births
1983 deaths
Footballers from West Lothian
Scottish footballers
Association football goalkeepers
Motherwell F.C. players
Albion Rovers F.C. players
Scottish Football League players
Scotland international footballers
Scottish Football League representative players
Montrose F.C. players
Motherwell F.C. wartime guest players
People from Armadale, West Lothian
League of Ireland players
Expatriate association footballers in the Republic of Ireland
Scottish expatriate sportspeople in Ireland
Scottish expatriate footballers